These are the results of 2017 BWF World Senior Championships' 50+ events.

Men's singles

Seeds
 Narong Vanichitsarakul (final, silver medal)
 Peter Moritz (second round)
 Magnus Nytell (withdrew)
 Surachai Makkasasithorn (third round)
 Jean-Jacques Bontemps (quarterfinals)
 Klaus Buschbeck (quarterfinals)
 Chang Kim Long (second round)
 Karoon Kasayapanan (champion, gold medal)

Results

Finals

Top half

Section 1

Section 2

Bottom half

Section 3

Section 4

Women's singles

Seeds
 Betty Blair (semifinals, bronze medal)
 Ye Wang (semifinals, bronze medal)
 Bettina Villars (second round)
 Zhou Xin (champion, gold medal)

Finals

Top half

Section 1

Section 2

Bottom half

Section 3

Section 4

Men's doubles

Seeds
 Surachai Makkasasithorn / Narong Vanichitsarakul (second round)
 Patrik Bjorkler / Nick Ponting (quarterfinals)
 Magnus Nytell / Erik Soderberg (quarterfinals)
 Karyanto Tan / Alexander Tandun (second round)

Finals

Top half

Section 1

Section 2

Bottom half

Section 3

Section 4

Women's doubles

Seeds
 Betty Blair / Debora Miller (champions, gold medal)
 Ye Wang /  Zhou Xin (final, silver medal)

Group A

Group B

Group C

Group D

Finals

Mixed doubles

Seeds
 Magnus Nytell /  Grace Kakiay (semifinals, bronze medal)
 Erik Soderberg / Anki Gunners (semifinals, bronze medal)
 Toru Koizumi / Naoko Saegusa (quarterfinals)
 Mark Topping /  Debora Miller (final, silver medal)

Finals

Top half

Section 1

Section 2

Bottom half

Section 3

Section 4

References

Men's singles
Results

Women's singles
Results

Men's doubles
Results

Women's doubles
Group A Results
Group B Results
Group C Results
Group D Results
Finals Results

Mixed doubles
Results

2017 BWF World Senior Championships